Sarpedones, also spelled Sarpadones (Kharosthi: 𐨯𐨤𐨅𐨡𐨞) was an Indo-Parthian king. He was a lieutenant or kinsman of Gondophares, and ruled Sakastan, where he had coins minted with the title of King of Kings.

References

Sources
  

Indo-Parthian kings
1st-century monarchs in Asia
Year of death unknown
Year of birth unknown
1st-century Iranian people